OW, O.W. or ow may refer to:

 Ow!, an interjection that denotes pain
 ow (digraph), an English digraph
 "Ow!" (composition), a Dizzy Gillespie bebop jazz composition
 Obwalden, a canton of Switzerland
 Organization Workshop, a method of adult education
 Executive Airlines (IATA code OW)
 Overwatch (video game)
 Outer Wilds, a 2019 space exploration video game
 Old Westminster, an alumna or alumnus of Westminster School

See also 
Ouch (disambiguation)
OWW (disambiguation)